Alex Kennedy (born 13 October 1992) is a New Zealand rower. He came fourth at the 2015 World Rowing Championships with the men's eight, qualifying the boat for the 2016 Olympics.

References

External links
 

Living people
1992 births
New Zealand male rowers
Olympic rowers of New Zealand
Rowers at the 2016 Summer Olympics